Vesala is a Finnish surname. Notable people with the surname include:

 Edward Vesala (1945–1999), French avant-garde jazz drummer
 Paula Vesala (born 1981), Finnish singer-songwriter, actress and playwright
 Tommi Vesala (born 1986), Finnish football player

Finnish-language surnames